Myra is an unincorporated community in Lincoln County, West Virginia, United States. A post office was operated at Myra from  September 7, 1883 until it was closed on March 19, 2011. The community was founded at the same time the post office was established.

Notable people
 Chuck Yeager, aviator (1923-2020), was born in Myra.

References

Unincorporated communities in Lincoln County, West Virginia
Unincorporated communities in West Virginia